Woodridge is a village in DuPage County, Illinois, with small portions in Will and Cook counties, and a south-western suburb of Chicago. Per the 2020 census, the population was 34,158.

The village is just north of the I-55 junction with IL-53. It uses the 630 and 331 area codes. Woodridge is the home of the Home Run Inn pizzeria chain and was the home of Pabst Brewing Company from 2006 to 2011.

Woodridge was incorporated on August 24, 1959, with less than 500 residents. It is named for its location in a wooded area above a steep hillside, locally known as "The Ridge". The Ridge overlooks the DuPage River's East Branch and the Des Plaines Valley. Woodridge is a young community with the vast majority of its homes, businesses, and churches constructed after the 1950s. Woodridge was founded by a housing developer, Albert Kaufman, who was largely responsible for the creation of the village.

In July 2007, Woodridge was ranked No. 61 on Money magazine's "100 Best Places to Live".

Geography
Woodridge is located at  (41.744582, −88.043869).

Woodridge is bordered by Naperville  to the west, Downers Grove to the northeast, Darien to the east,  Lemont to the south, Bolingbrook to the southwest, and  Lisle to the northwest.

Transportation
Two interstates run through Woodridge: the Veterans Memorial Tollway (I-355) and the Stevenson Expressway (I-55). The Veterans Memorial Tollway allows access to a variety of western and northwestern Chicago suburbs, while I-55 gives direct access to Chicago to the north and Joliet and downstate Illinois to the south. Other important routes are 75th Street and Illinois Route 53.

An industrial spur for the Burlington Northern Santa Fe Railroad serves International Center, a large industrial area in the far south section. Commuter passenger rail service between Chicago and Aurora can be accessed in nearby Lisle or Downers Grove.

Bus service is provided by Pace, under the coordination of the Regional Transportation Authority.

Major highways
Major highways in Woodridge include:

Interstate Highways
 Interstate 55
 Interstate 355

US Highways
 Historic US 66

Illinois Highways
 Route 53

Government
The village's government is overseen by the Mayor and a board of trustees elected at large.  the mayor is Gina Cunningham-Picek. The Village Clerk is Joseph Kagann and the Village Trustees are Greg Abbott, Mary Anne Blair, Cameron Hendricks, Mike Krucek, Magin "Mike" Martinez, and Kaleshia "Kay" Page. Village departments include Finance, Administration, Police, Building and Zoning, Community Development, and Public Works.

The Police Department is a full-service force of 51 officers, a records department and a resource center. The Woodridge Police Department contracts with DuPage Public Safety Communications to provide dispatch services. Woodridge was one of the first communities nationwide to adopt aggressive legislation against underage tobacco use, and the Woodridge Police Department was one of the first to conduct regular "sting" operations using young teens hired by the department to check compliance for tobacco and alcohol sales.

The Building and Zoning department monitors construction permits, land use, up keep, and other considerations.

Public Works is responsible for the streets and other village infrastructure, including the water supply. Woodridge receives its water from Lake Michigan.

The Village Hall is located in Town Center at Five Plaza Drive. Town Center also includes the Police/Public Works building (One Plaza Drive), the Woodridge Public Library (Three Plaza Drive), and the United States post office (Two Plaza Drive).

Woodridge lies within three fire protection districts, the boundaries of which were drawn before the incorporation of the village. As a result, Woodridge does not maintain a village fire department. The fire departments serving the residents are the Lisle-Woodridge Fire District, the Darien-Woodridge Fire District, and the Lemont Fire District. Lisle-Woodridge is top rated as "ISO 1" by the Insurance Services Office.

Demographics
As of the 2020 census there were 34,158 people, 13,023 households, and 8,762 families residing in the village. The racial makeup of the village was 60.85% White, 10.04% African American, 0.47% Native American, 13.30% Asian, 0.05% Pacific Islander, 6.61% from other races, and 8.68% from two or more races. Hispanic or Latino of any race were 14.80% of the population.

There were 13,023 households, out of which 53.36% had children under the age of 18 living with them, 52.98% were married couples living together, 11.09% had a female householder with no husband present, and 32.72% were non-families. 26.74% of all households were made up of individuals, and 7.55% had someone living alone who was 65 years of age or older. The average household size was 3.18 and the average family size was 2.56.

The village's age distribution consisted of 22.7% under the age of 18, 8.2% from 18 to 24, 30.7% from 25 to 44, 27.5% from 45 to 64, and 11.0% who were 65 years of age or older. The median age was 37.5 years. For every 100 females, there were 101.9 males. For every 100 females age 18 and over, there were 102.0 males.

The median income for a household in the village was $88,803, and the median income for a family was $104,957. Males had a median income of $52,368 versus $41,125 for females. The per capita income for the village was $43,098. About 2.3% of families and 4.4% of the population were below the poverty line, including 5.0% of those under age 18 and 3.4% of those age 65 or over.

Note: the US Census treats Hispanic/Latino as an ethnic category. This table excludes Latinos from the racial categories and assigns them to a separate category. Hispanics/Latinos can be of any race.

Climate and environment

Woodridge is in a humid continental climate zone. On average, July is the warmest month, and January is the coldest month. August typically has the most precipitation, and February the least. The record high for Woodridge was 105 °F (40.56 °C) in July 2005, and the record low of −26 °F (−32 °C) was set in January 1985.

Woodridge has been named a "Tree City" by the Arbor Day Foundation for the past 16 years, and a study undertaken in 1996 indicated that village has over 8,000 publicly owned trees.

On June 20, 2021, just after 11pm local time, Woodridge was struck by an EF-3 tornado. The storm damaged 225 homes in Woodridge and adjoining suburbs. The tornado also damaged the rectory of Saint Scholastica Church and demolished the rectory's garage. There were no fatalities and eight people were sent to area hospitals.

Education
The Village of Woodridge School District 68 maintains six elementary schools, Edgewood, Willow Creek, Sipley, William F. Murphy (named after Mayor Murphy), Meadowview, and Goodrich, (serving grades K-6) and one junior high, Jefferson Junior High School, (for grades 7 and 8). Woodridge does not have its own high school. The majority of Woodridge secondary school students attend Downers Grove North or South High Schools in the recently renamed Community High School District 99. Some students in southern Woodridge are served by Lemont District 210 and attend Lemont High School. Additionally, Woodridge students who reside west of the DuPage River (Seven Bridges Single-Family Residences) attend Naperville schools in District 203. Some students also attend the nearby parochial schools St. Scholastica (K-8), St. Joan of Arc (PK-8) and Benet Academy (9–12) and Montini Catholic

Nearby higher education opportunities are Benedictine University (Lisle), North Central College (Naperville), Lewis University (Romeoville), College of DuPage (Glen Ellyn), Joliet Junior College (Romeoville and Joliet) and University of St. Francis (Joliet).

Recreation
The Woodridge Park District maintains a well distributed group of local parks and open spaces, offering facilities for picnicking as well as sports like baseball, basketball, tennis, soccer, cricket and newly added for 2008, Frisbee golf. The Park District also maintains Cypress Cove water park and the Athletic Recreation Center which opened in January 2017.

A skate park was added in to Janes Avenue Park. It allows for skateboarders, BMX riders, and inline skaters to skate at their own risk. There is no daily entrance fee. The skate park is open from 10:00 a.m.-10:00 p.m. The park does have lights.

A series of bike paths built by the park district allow cyclists to ride through the town on paved, dedicated paths.

Golf is another popular recreational activity. Village Greens of Woodridge is a Village-owned, 18-hole golf course; Seven Bridges is another Woodridge owned (but not members-only) championship class course. Zigfield Troy is a 9-hole, par 3 course.

Woodridge is home to two multi-screen movie theaters, most notably IMAX at Seven Bridges and Hollywood Boulevard, as well as dining options ranging from fast food to formal banquets.

Woodridge is also located near the renowned Morton Arboretum.

Notable people
 Thax Douglas, poet
 Frank Kaminsky, NBA player for the Phoenix Suns
 Nick Solak, MLB player for the Texas Rangers
 James "Turk" Torello, American mobster, caporegime and enforcer for Chicago Outfit
 Doug Walker, film critic, Internet personality
 Aileen Marie Quinn, She is best known for her role as Annie Bennett Warbucks in the 1982 film 'Annie'

References

External links
Village of Woodridge official website
Woodridge Public Library
Community High School District 99
Woodridge School District 68
Woodridge church list

 
Villages in Cook County, Illinois
Villages in DuPage County, Illinois
Villages in Will County, Illinois
1959 establishments in Illinois
Populated places established in 1959